Slovenia is scheduled to compete at the 2017 World Aquatics Championships in Budapest, Hungary from 14 July to 30 July.

Open water swimming

Slovenia has entered one open water swimmer

Swimming

Slovenian swimmers have achieved qualifying standards in the following events (up to a maximum of 2 swimmers in each event at the A-standard entry time, and 1 at the B-standard):

Men

* Stevens won the swim-off race against two others to compete in the semifinals.

Women

References

Nations at the 2017 World Aquatics Championships
Slovenia at the World Aquatics Championships
2017 in Slovenian sport